Pseudancistrus coquenani is a species of catfish in the family Loricariidae. It is native to South America, where it occurs in the basin of the Cuquenán River, which itself is part of the upper Caroní River drainage in Venezuela. The species reaches 8.1 cm (3.2 inches) SL, and it is named for the river basin in which it is found.

References 

Loricariidae
Fish described in 1915